Ranville is a commune in the Calvados department in the Normandy region in northwestern France.

Ranville was the first French village liberated on D-Day.  The village was liberated by the British 13th Parachute Battalion, commanded by Lieutenant-Colonel Peter Luard.  The château du Heaume in the village was subsequently used by the headquarters of the British 6th Airborne Division.

The village features prominently in the book 13 - Lucky For Some which is about the history of the 13th (Lancashire) Parachute Battalion. There are many then and now photographs as well as maps and diagrams of battles that took place in the region.

Population

Sights
Château de Guernon-Ranville
Memorial Pegasus
Ranville War Cemetery

Gallery

See also
Communes of the Calvados department

References

Communes of Calvados (department)
Calvados communes articles needing translation from French Wikipedia